Ponts-Moteurs was the brand name of a French twin-cylinder 1081 cc power pack manufactured in Paris and sold from 1912 until 1913.  It was meant to transform horse-drawn vehicles into motor vehicles "in a few hours, without modification".

References
David Burgess Wise, The New Illustrated Encyclopedia of Automobiles.

Defunct motor vehicle manufacturers of France